Magick Without Tears, a series of letters, was the last book written by English occultist Aleister Crowley (1875–1947), although it was not published until after his death. It was written in 1943 and published in 1954 with a foreword by its editor, Karl Germer.

Summary
The book consists of 80 letters to various students of magick. Originally to be titled Aleister Explains Everything, the letters offer his insights into both magick and Thelema—Crowley's religious and ethical system—with a clarity and wit often absent in his earlier writings. The individual topics are widely varied, addressing the orders O.T.O. and A∴A∴, Qabalah, Thelemic morality, Yoga, astrology, various magical techniques, religion, death, spiritual visions, the Holy Guardian Angel, and other issues such as marriage, property, certainty, and meanness. The book is considered by many as evidence that Crowley remained lucid and mentally capable at the end of his life, despite his addiction to heroin (prescribed for his chronic emphysema).

Editions
  With a foreword by its editor.
  With an introduction by its editor.
 With a new afterword by the publisher.

See also
List of works by Aleister Crowley

References 

1954 non-fiction books
Books published posthumously
Collections of letters
Ceremonial magic
Thelemite texts
Works by Aleister Crowley